Lincolnshire-Prairie View School District 103 is an elementary district located in Lincolnshire Lake County, Illinois, in suburban Chicago. The school district serves approximately 1,800 students from the communities of Lincolnshire and Prairie View and portions of Buffalo Grove, Vernon Hills, Mettawa, Riverwoods, and Lake Forest. Students attend Laura B. Sprague Elementary School (K-2), Half Day Intermediate School (3-5) and Daniel Wright Junior High Schools (6-8). Students from this district usually would later attend Adlai E. Stevenson High School also located within Lincolnshire.

Instructional Program
The instructional program for students focuses on skill development in core academic areas that include reading/language arts, math, science and social science. The curriculum envelops social/emotional learning, as well as national educational technology standards. Furthermore, the curriculum provides students with learning opportunities in physical education/health, fine arts, foreign language, and family and consumer studies. Students also benefit by having instructors assist classroom teachers through the Enrichment Learning Model (ELM).

The 2008 Illinois District and School Report Cards, based on results from the Illinois Standards Achievement Tests (ISATs) administered in March 2008, confirm recognition of District 103 as one of the highest academically performing elementary school districts in the state.

Honors and awards
U.S. Department of Education: All three District 103 schools have received national recognition for excellence in education as a Blue Ribbon School.

National Board Certification: Twenty-two District 103 staff members have achieved this recognition from the National Board for Professional Teaching Standards.

2009 Bright Red Apple Award for Educational Excellence: District 103 is 1 of 14 elementary districts in Lake County to receive this recognition by SchoolSearch.

2008 SchoolSearch Bright A+ Award: District 103 is 1 of 10 elementary districts in Lake County to earn this distinction for academic excellence.

2008 Academic Excellence Awards: District 103 schools received this distinction as Illinois Honor Roll Schools.

References

External links
 

Lincolnshire, Illinois
School districts in Lake County, Illinois